Clarity may refer to:

Arts, entertainment, and media

Fictional entities
 Clarity, a magic spell in the online game EverQuest
 Clarity, a fictional drug from the film Minority Report

Music

Albums
 Clarity (Jimmy Eat World album)
 Clarity (Kim Petras album)
 Clarity (Sifow album)
 Clarity (Zedd album)
 Clarity, a 2010 album by Article One

Songs
 "Clarity" (John Mayer song), a 2003 song by John Mayer
 "Clarity" (Senakah song)
 "Clarity" (Zedd song), a 2012 song by Russian-German electronic dance music producer Zedd featuring the vocals of British singer Foxes
 "Clarity", a song by All That Remains from the 2002 album Behind Silence and Solitude
 "Clarity", a song by Attila from the 2021 album Closure
 "Clarity", a song by Kim Petras from the 2019 album of the same name
 "Clarity", an instrumental song by Linkin Park from LP Underground 12
 "Clarity", a song by Northlane from the 2022 album Obsidian
 "Clarity", a song by Protest the Hero from the 2013 album Volition
 "Clarity", a song by Upon a Burning Body from the 2022 album Fury
 "The Clarity" a 2014 single by Sleep

Other uses in arts, entertainment, and media
 Clarity (Homeland), an episode of the television series Homeland

Brands and enterprises
 Clarity Wireless, a wireless networking company
 Honda FCX Clarity, a hydrogen fuel cell automobile

Science and technology
 Optical clarity meter, an instrument used to measure the transparency of an object
 CLARITY (Clear, Lipid-exchanged, Anatomically Rigid, Imaging/immunostaining compatible, Tissue hYdrogel), a method of making brain tissue transparent using acrylamide discovered by researchers from the Stanford University School of Medicine

Other uses
 Clarity Act, Canadian bill C-20
 CLARITY – Employment for Blind People, a charitable organization
 Diamond clarity, relating to the appearance of internal and surface defects in diamond
 Image clarity or image resolution, the detail of an image

See also
 Clearness committee, a Quaker religious practice
 Transparency (disambiguation)